Abdul Fatawu Safiu (born July 16, 1994) is a Ghanaian professional footballer who plays as a striker for Swedish club Trollhättan.

Club career

Early career 
Safiu began his career with Liberty Professionals, before moving to International Allies in 2013. He had loan spells with Swedish side Vimmerby IF in 2013, and American United Soccer League side Portland Timbers 2 in 2015 and Whitecaps FC 2 in 2016.

Inter Allies 
In 2014, after returning from his loan with Vimmerby IF.  He came back to play the second round of the 2013–14 Ghana Premier League. He played 14 matches in all competitions, scored 7 goals and made 4 assists, in the process he helping them to avoid relegation and place 6th on the league table. He also led them to their first Ghanaian FA Cup final after scoring the only goal in the semi-final against Feyenoord. They however lost in the finals to Kumasi Asante Kotoko.

FC Shirak 
In February 2017, Safiu signed a six-month loan deal with FC Shirak, leaving on 9 June 2017. In his short loan spell won his first professional trophy after FC Shirak scored Pyunik 3–0 in the final to win the 2016–17 Armenian Cup.

Eleven Wonders 
In April 2018, Safiu joined for his hometown club Techiman Eleven Wonders as a free agent ahead of their maiden Ghana Premier League campaign. He signed a one-year deal with the newly promoted side. On his debut match on 6 May 2018 against Cape Coast Ebusua Dwarfs, he scored in the 35th minute and proved an assist to veteran striker Alex Asamoah's goal to give them a 2–0 win. In his short stint with the club, he played 4 matches and scored 2 goals, with the other goal coming on 30 May 2018, in a 2–0 victory over Berekum Chelsea.

Asante Kotoko 
Safiu joined Kumasi Asante Kotoko in November 2018, ahead of the 2018–19 CAF Confederation Cup campaign. He was registered and named on the club's official squad list for the CAF tournament. Even though they were eliminated at the group stages, he was one of their standout performers as he scored 3 goals in 10 matches, as Asante Kotoko reached the group stages of the tournament for the first time in 11 years. In the league, Safiu scored 10 goals to end up joint top goal scorer (tied with Diawisie Taylor) and help Kotoko clinch the 2019 GFA Normalization Committee Special Competition. At the end of the season, he was adjudged the Ghana Football Awards Home-Based player of the year reflecting the impact he made. He beat off competition from his teammate Felix Annan and Accra Hearts of Oak defender Mohammed Alhassan to win the award.

Trelleborgs FF 
On 13 August 2019, Swedish club Trelleborgs announced the acquisition Safiu on a permanent deal for the remainder of the 2019 season with an option to extend the deal for a further two years. Prior to signing for Superettan side Trelleborgs FF, he went on a two weeks trial fellow Swedish club Helsinborg IF but a deal was not reached after both parties couldn't settle on a transfer price. On 26 July 2020, Safiu scored his first career hat-trick after striking thrice in Trelleborgs’ 4–1 defeat of Dalkurd FF in a Superettan match. He scored the first in the 12th minute and scored two quickfire goals in the 41st and 43rd minute to complete a first-half hat-trick. The goals ensured that he ended his eight-month goal drought after scoring against Jönköpings Södra IF on 3 November 2019.

Trollhättan
On 11 August 2021, Safiu moved to Trollhättan in the Swedish third-tier Ettan Södra.

International career 
Safiu was called up to the Ghana national football team by Kwesi Appiah in June 2019 ahead of a Pre-AFCON friendly match against Namibia. On 10 June 2019, he made his debut after he was named on the starting line up for the game, which ended in a 1–0 to their Namibian counterparts.

Personal life 
On 5 January 2019, Safiu married his girlfriend, Adila Jafar, during an Islamic ceremony in the Encom Hotel in his hometown Techiman.

Honours 
Shirak

 Armenian Cup: 2016–17

Asante Kotoko

 GFA Special Competition: 2019
Individual
 GFA Special Competition Top Goal Scorer: 2019
Ghana Football Awards Home-Based player of the year: 2019

References

External links
Timbers 2 bio
Fatawu Safiu at Footballdatabase

1994 births
Living people
Ghanaian footballers
Ghanaian expatriate footballers
USL Championship players
Armenian Premier League players
Superettan players
Vimmerby IF players
Liberty Professionals F.C. players
International Allies F.C. players
Portland Timbers 2 players
Whitecaps FC 2 players
FC Shirak players
Asante Kotoko S.C. players
Trelleborgs FF players
FC Trollhättan players
Association football forwards
Footballers from Accra
Ghanaian expatriate sportspeople in Sweden
Ghanaian expatriate sportspeople in the United States
Ghanaian expatriate sportspeople in Canada
Ghanaian expatriate sportspeople in Armenia
Expatriate footballers in Sweden
Expatriate soccer players in the United States
Expatriate soccer players in Canada
Expatriate footballers in Armenia